Vladimir Breitchev (born December 16, 1958 in Samokov) is a Bulgarian ski jumper that came at the 19th place in the Olympic Games in the K-70 metre hill in 1984, which was the best result for Bulgaria in ski jumping at the Winter Olympics until 2018 where Vladimir Zografski finished 14th in the Men's Normal Hill competition. Breitchev also competed in Calgary 1988 and in Albertville 1992,

Breitchev has also won the 1983-84 Europa Cup.

Sources

External links 

1958 births
Living people
People from Samokov
Bulgarian male ski jumpers
Olympic ski jumpers of Bulgaria
Ski jumpers at the 1984 Winter Olympics
Ski jumpers at the 1988 Winter Olympics
Ski jumpers at the 1992 Winter Olympics
Sportspeople from Sofia Province